The EcoTarium is a science and nature museum located in Worcester, Massachusetts. Previously known as the New England Science Center, the museum features several permanent and traveling exhibits, the Alden Planetarium, a narrow-gauge train pulled by a scale model of an 1860s steam engine, and a variety of wildlife.

History
The EcoTarium was founded in 1825 as the Worcester Lyceum of Natural History. The first spaces dedicated to the museum were the Natural History Rooms on the third floor of the Worcester Bank Block on Foster Street, which opened on October 1, 1867. In 1891 the museum and its collection moved to the Old Edwin Conant Mansion at the corner of State and Harvard streets.

As the collection grew more and more space was needed. In 1954 the museum moved exhibits to the Daniels House and the Rice House at 41 Elm street, both in Worcester. At this point the name of the museum was changed to the Worcester Science Center, then changed again in 1986 to the New England Science Center.

In 1998 the museum yet again changed its name to the EcoTarium, and began an $18 million expansion and renovation project which was completed in 2000.

On June 13, 2011, Kenda the Polar Bear, a mainstay at the museum, died after developing kidney disease, a degenerative disease commonly found in older polar bears. After a steep decline in her health, the museum made the decision to euthanize Kenda. Following the launch of its "Third Century Plan," the museum announced it would transform the area formerly occupied by Kenda into "Wildcat Station."

In June 2016, the museum unveiled its "Third Century Plan," a $9.1 million capital campaign which will fund improvements to both its indoor and outdoor exhibits, programming, and infrastructure. Major components of this capital campaign include two new permanent exhibits ("City Science" and "Wildcat Station"), a new modern energy-efficient mechanical plant to replace its aged co-generation plant, and enhancements to its Explorer Express Train (including a new station that will be contracted at Wildcat Station).

On January 17, 2017, the museum opened "City Science," one of two new exhibits being funded by its capital campaign.

Featured Exhibits

The Arctic Next Door: Mount Washington
Located on the upper level of the museum, "The Arctic Next Door: Mount Washington" exhibit allows visitors to experience some of New England's wildest weather and the geology of New Hampshire's White Mountains. This exhibit features a hurricane simulator, as well as a multitude of interactive displays and activity stations.

Nature Explore Outdoor Exhibit
The "Nature Explore Outdoor Exhibit" features numerous themed areas designed to engage children and their families through activities such as building, digging, nature art, climbing, music and movement.

City Science: The Science You Live
Located on the middle level of the museum, the "City Science: The Science You Live" exhibit allows visitors to learn about the hidden science around them and where they live. The exhibit incorporates live animals, interactive components, and natural history specimens.

Other Permanent Exhibits
Other permanent exhibits at the EcoTarium include: African Communities, Bubbles!, Curator's Workshop, Freshwater, KEVA: Build It Up!, Minerals, Preschool Discovery Area, Secrets of the Forrest, and Water Planet. The museum features various outdoor living wildlife exhibits.

Planetarium
In addition to the various indoor and outdoor exhibits, the museum operates a digital planetarium.

External links
 Official site

References

Museums in Worcester, Massachusetts
Natural history museums in Massachusetts
Science museums in Massachusetts
Planetaria in the United States
Association of Science-Technology Centers member institutions
Paleontology in Massachusetts